Podjezierze  is a settlement in the administrative district of Gmina Świebodzin, within Świebodzin County, Lubusz Voivodeship, in western Poland.

References

Villages in Świebodzin County